Elise Isolde Stenevik (born 9 September 1999) is a Norwegian football defender who plays for Everton in the English Women's Super League. 

She has previously played Damallsvenskan football for Eskilstuna United and Toppserien football for Arna-Bjørnar.

Career
Stenevik is a prolific Norway youth international and has played for Florø, Arna-Bjørnar and Eskilstuna United.

In September 2022, she signed a two-year deal with Everton.

References

1999 births
Living people
People from Flora, Norway
Norway women's youth international footballers
Norwegian women's footballers
Women's association football fullbacks
Expatriate sportspeople in England